(born 27 February 1978 in Nagano City) is a Japanese former professional racing cyclist, who competed as a professional between 2003 and 2014.

Career
Miyazawa had a varied early career, riding cyclocross at first, then participating on various teams in Japan, Italy, and France, and even riding independently at times. He once quit road cycling to participate in the keirin school. Finally settling on road cycling with Bridgestone Anchor in 2005, Miyazawa quickly established himself as one of Japan's top sprinters, reaching the podium not only in Japan, but in Asia and Europe as well. He was Asian champion in 2007 and represented Japan in the 2008 Summer Olympics. He was hired by the UCI Professional Continental team Amica Chips-Knauf in 2009 but returned to his Japanese team when Amica Chips floundered due to financial difficulties. Joining Team Nippo in 2010, he won the Japanese national championship that year. On 28 October 2010, it was announced that Miyazawa had signed to ride with the new Italian Pro Continental team, for the 2011 season. On 21 October 2011, it was announced that Miyazawa signed a one-year contract with UCI World Tour team  for the 2012 season.

For the 2014 season, Miyazawa rejoined , but announced his retirement at the end of that season. After his retirement, he assumed the post of manager of the Lemonade Bellmare cycling team.

Major results

2006
 1st Tour de Okinawa
 1st Stage 4 Tour of Siam
 1st Stage 2 Tour de Hokkaido
 5th Flèche Hesbignonne
 7th Japan Cup
2007
 1st Road race, Asian Road Championships
 1st Tour de Okinawa
 1st Stage 1 Tour of Japan
 2nd Ronde van Overijssel
 2nd Circuito de Getxo
 3rd Road race, National Road Championships
 6th Overall Vuelta Ciclista a León
 6th Tro-Bro Léon
 8th Grand Prix de Rennes
 9th Châteauroux Classic
 10th Japan Cup
2008
 1st  Overall Tour de Hokkaido
1st Points classification
 3rd Road race, Asian Road Championships
 3rd Overall Tour de Taiwan
 6th Grand Prix de Rennes
2009
 1st  Overall Tour de Hokkaido
1st Stages 1 (TTT) & 5
 2nd Road race, National Road Championships
 4th Circuito de Getxo
 10th Châteauroux Classic
2010
 1st  Road race, National Road Championships
 1st Kumamoto International Road Race
 1st Stage 2 Vuelta Ciclista a León
 2nd  Road race, Asian Games
 2nd Road race, Asian Road Championships
 2nd Overall Tour de Kumano
1st Prologue
 4th Overall Tour de Taiwan
1st Stages 3 & 4
 6th Japan Cup
 7th Overall Tour de Okinawa
2011
 1st Izegem Koerse
 5th Paris–Brussels
 6th Road race, Asian Road Championships
 6th Gran Premio Nobili Rubinetterie
2012
 5th Overall Tour de Picardie
2013
 5th Grand Prix de Denain
2014
 4th Road race, Asian Road Championships
 5th GP Izola
 7th Road race, Asian Games

Personal life
In 2001, Miyazawa donated half his liver to his mother, who was suffering from cirrhosis of the liver.

References

External links

 
  

1978 births
Living people
Japanese male cyclists
People from Nagano Prefecture
Olympic cyclists of Japan
Cyclists at the 2008 Summer Olympics
Asian Games medalists in cycling
Cyclists at the 2010 Asian Games
Cyclists at the 2014 Asian Games
Medalists at the 2010 Asian Games
Asian Games silver medalists for Japan